YourOneLife-YOL is an application made in India and used by All India Council Of Technical Education's(AICTE)  for measuring Personal & Institutional Happiness Index in Educational Institutions associated to it. Around 50 lakh students and 12000 Higher Educational Institutions get benefitted from it. It is created by Blockchain network company 5ire and is claimed to be biggest happiness blockchain with a potential for recording,issuing and verifying more than 8 million students academic credentials.

Objective 

YourOneLife-YOL app is made in India and helps in reflecting personal and institutional happiness guiding approximately 50 lakh students and around 12000 Higher Educational Institutions. It claims to be the  largest blockchain-based academic accreditation system, as it has a potential capacity usage for more than 8 million students, who can use it for recording,issuing and verifying the academic credentials.

Features 

Following are the features of 5ire designed YourOneLife-YOL app:

 Institutional and Individual Happiness Index assessment.

 Individual and Institution mindshare assessment.

 Individual and Institutional mind mapping.

See Also 

 Technology

References

External links 
 Official Website

All India Council for Technical Education